Geoff Farrelly (9 April 1908 – 28 June 1990) was an  Australian rules footballer who played with Hawthorn in the Victorian Football League (VFL).

Notes

External links 

1908 births
1990 deaths
Australian rules footballers from Victoria (Australia)
Hawthorn Football Club players